The Polytechnic University of the Philippines, Mulanay Extension also known as PUP-MQ is a satellite campus of the Polytechnic University of the Philippines founded through Republic Act 7654, otherwise known as the General Appropriations Act of 1991. It is located at Mulanay, Quezon, Philippines.

Undergraduate programs
College of Education (COED)
 Bachelor of Business Teacher Education (BBTE)

College of Business (CB)
 Bachelor of Science in Entrepreneurial Management (BSEM)
 Bachelor of Science in Agri-Business Management (BSABM)
 Bachelor of Office Administration (BOA)

College of Technology (CT)
 Diploma in Office Management Technology (DOMT)

References

External links 
 Polytechnic University of the Philippines – Official website

Polytechnic University of the Philippines
Universities and colleges in Quezon